Refia Sultan may refer to:
 Refia Sultan (daughter of Abdulmejid I) (1842-1880), Ottoman princess
 Refia Sultan (daughter of Abdul Hamid II) (1891-1938), Ottoman princess